Flis may refer to:
 Dmitry Flis (born 1984), Russian basketball player
 Jesse Flis (born 1933), Canadian politician
 Marcin Flis (born 1994), Polish footballer
 Sylvester Flis (born 1974), American ice sledge hockey player
 Flis (opera)

See also 
 FLI (disambiguation)